The Oneida Number Three Tunnel (also known as the Oneida #3 Tunnel) is a mine tunnel in Schuylkill County, Pennsylvania, in the United States. It is one of five major mine tunnels in the watershed of Catawissa Creek. The tunnel discharges into Tomhicken Creek downstream of the mouth of Little Tomhicken Creek. The tunnel was constructed in the 1930s and a passive treatment system was installed at the site of the tunnel in 2009. The tunnel is more than a mile long.

Hydrology
The average discharge of the Oneida Number Three Tunnel is 3,820,000 gallons per day (approximately 2,653 gallons per minute). The tunnel is the largest discharge of acid mine drainage to Tomhicken Creek.

The pH of the water being discharged from the Oneida Number Three Tunnel ranges from 3.9 to 4.7. The average pH of the waters is 4.53. The acidity load requires an 89 percent reduction to meet its total maximum daily load requirements. The net concentration of acidity is 15.8 milligrams per liter.

The iron load does not require any reduction to meet its total maximum daily load requirements. The manganese load requires a 79 percent reduction to meet its total maximum daily load requirements. The aluminum load requires a 71 percent reduction to meet its total maximum daily load requirements.

Description and geography
The Oneida Number Three Tunnel discharges into Tomhicken Creek downstream of Little Tomhicken Creek. The upper end of the tunnel is in mines in the South Green Mountain Coal Basin, which it drains part of. The tunnel runs roughly northwards until it reaches Tomhicken Creek. The tunnel is in East Union Township and North Union Township.

The Oneida Number Three Tunnel is in the Eastern Middle Anthracite Field. The tunnel is between Tomhicken Creek and a steep hill.

The total maximum daily load document for Catawissa Creek suggests reclaiming mined land in the Green Mountain Coal Basin to reduce the discharge of the Oneida Number Three Tunnel.

The Oneida Number Three Tunnel has a passive treatment system. The system was constructed in a similar manner to the way in which the Audenried Tunnel was constructed. However, it only has one limestone tank, as opposed to the Audenried Tunnel's three. There are plans to construct a second limestone tank for the passive treatment system.

History
The Oneida Number Three tunnel was constructed during the 1930s. It was one of five mine drainage tunnels in the Catawissa Creek watershed to be constructed during this time (the others being the Audenried Tunnel, the Catawissa Tunnel, the Green Mountain Tunnel, and the Oneida Number One Tunnel).

The Catawissa Creek Restoration Association started working on constructing a passive treatment system for the Oneida Number Three Tunnel as early as 2003. The organization's work was funded by the United States Environmental Protection Agency. The construction of the passive treatment system was completed in December 2009. The system was the third such system in the Catawissa Creek to be constructed.

The Oneida Number Three Tunnel was damaged to the point of being useless during heavy rain in March 2011. It was repaired later in 2011. The tunnel's water quality was studied in the same year. It was also studied shortly after the passive treatment system was constructed.

As of 2003, the Oneida Number Three Tunnel is not listed on the Pennsylvania Section 303(d) of streams that are impaired due to pH.

See also
Audenried Tunnel coal mining drainage in Luzerne County
Catawissa Tunnel coal mining drainage in Schuylkill County
Green Mountain Tunnel coal mining drainage in Schuylkill County
Jeddo Tunnel coal mining drainage in Luzerne County
Oneida Number One Tunnel coal mining drainage in Schuylkill County
Quakake Tunnel coal mining drainage in Carbon County

References

External links
Map of the Catawissa Creek watershed (where the Oneida Number Three Tunnel is located)

Drainage tunnels in the United States
Tunnels in Pennsylvania
Coal mining in the United States
1930s establishments in Pennsylvania
Mining in Pennsylvania
Tunnels completed in the 1930s
Transportation buildings and structures in Schuylkill County, Pennsylvania
Environment of Pennsylvania
Tributaries of Catawissa Creek